Laurence Doherty and Reginald Doherty defeated Clement Cazalet and Sydney Smith 6–2 7–5 2–6 6–2 in the All Comers' Final, and then defeated the reigning champions Herbert Baddeley and Wilfred Baddeley 6–4, 4–6, 8–6, 6–4 in the challenge round to win the gentlemen's doubles tennis title at the 1897 Wimbledon Championships.

Draw

Challenge round

All Comers'

References

External links

Gentlemen's Doubles
Wimbledon Championship by year – Men's doubles